Hemicidaridae is a family of extinct sea urchins characterized by large, massive, club-shaped spines.

These epifaunal grazer-deposit feeders lived in Jurassic and Cretaceous ages (from 189.6 to 112.6 Ma).

Taxonomy
List of genera and subfamilies:
 Subfamily Hemicidarinae  Wright, 1857 †
Asterocidaris Cotteau, 1859 †
Gymnocidaris L. Agassiz, 1838 †
 Hemicidaris L. Agassiz, 1838 †
 Subfamily Pseudocidarinae Smith & Wright, 1993 †
Cidaropsis Cotteau, 1863 †
Pseudocidaris Pomel, 1883 †
Gymnocidaris L. Agassiz, 1838 †
 Hemicidaris (Sphaerotiaris) Lambert & Thiéry, 1914 †

Distribution
Fossils of species within this genus have been found in the Jurassic and Cretaceous sediments in Europe, Africa, North America and China.

References

Prehistoric echinoderm families
Jurassic first appearances
Cretaceous extinctions